Falernum (pronounced ) is either an 11% ABV syrup liqueur or a nonalcoholic syrup from the Caribbean. It is best known for its use in tropical drinks. It contains flavors of ginger, lime, and almond, and frequently cloves or allspice.  It may be thought of as a spicier version of orgeat syrup.

The form can be alcoholic (syrup liqueur) or nonalcoholic (syrup). Versions with alcohol are generally lower in proof (≅15 ABV), adding rum and emphasizing the clove, ginger, or allspice flavoring aspects for use in mixing cocktails, typically tropical or tiki drinks. It is also enjoyed on the rocks.

Depending on sugar content, the consistency is often thick and is therefore sometimes referred to as "velvet falernum" because of the feeling it leaves on one's tongue. Brands vary. The color can be white to light amber, and it may be clear or translucent.

History
The origination of falernum may date back to the 18th century, when it was made as a punch in the areas around Barbados. Some disagreement exists over the origin of the name, and whether the earliest versions would have included the steeping of almonds.
 The same references also assert that earlier versions contained bitters such as wormwood. The inclusion of bitters historically would seem to be corroborated by a 1982 article appearing in The New York Times.

In the literary magazine All the Year Round, owned by Charles Dickens Jr. at the time, an unnamed author wrote of falernum in 1892, describing it as "a curious liqueur composed from rum and lime-juice".

The earliest known reference in bar manuals seems to be the 1930s. One producer claims his recipe dates to 1890, winning awards as early as 1923.

Use in cocktails
Drinks using falernum include:

Better and Better
Captain's Blood Cocktail
Corn 'n Oil (Barbados)
Frosty Dawn
Key Cocktail
Mai Tai (not Trader Vic's)
Port Antonio Cocktail
Puka Punch
Royal Bermuda Cocktail
Rum Collins (some variations)
Bermuda Rum Swizzle
Saturn Cocktail
White Lion
Zombie (Don the Beachcomber's)
 Trader Sam's Uh-Oa!
 Tourist n’ Sugar
 Three Dots and a Dash

See also
Fassionola syrup
 List of syrups
Orgeat syrup

References

Sugar substitutes
Liqueurs
Barbadian cuisine
Syrup
Drink mixers
Almonds